Sitting volleyball will be played at the 2019 Parapan American Games. The winner of each tournament will be automatically qualified to participate in the 2020 Summer Paralympics.

Medalists

Teams' roster
Men

Women

Men's tournament
There are six nations participating in the men's tournament.

5/6th classification match

Semifinals

Bronze medal match

Gold medal match

Women's tournament
There are four nations participating in the women's tournament.

Semifinals

Bronze medal match

Gold medal match

See also
Volleyball at the 2019 Pan American Games
Volleyball at the 2020 Summer Paralympics

References

2019 Parapan American Games
International volleyball competitions hosted by Peru
Volleyball at the Pan American Games
2019 in volleyball